The Canadian Marathon Championships is the annual national championships for the marathon in Canada. The event is currently part of the Toronto Waterfront Marathon. The event was held in Ottawa beginning with its inception in 2000 before moving to Toronto in 2015.

At the 2018 championship, Cameron Levins broke the Canadian marathon record in the Toronto Waterfront Marathon by 44 seconds with a time of 2:09:25, beating the 43 years record by Jerome Drayton of 2:10:09 in 1975.

Results

See also
Athletics Canada
Canadian records in track and field
Canadian Track and Field Championships
Canadian Half Marathon Championships
Canadian 10Km Road Race Championships
Canadian 5Km Road Race Championships
Sports in Canada
Marathons at the World Championships in Athletics
IAAF World Marathon Cup

References

Marathons in Canada
National athletics competitions
Annual sporting events in Canada